Hugh Ross may refer to:

 Hugh Ross (musician) (c. 1898–1990), American choral director and conductor
 Hugh McGregor Ross (1917–2014), computing pioneer and specialist in the Gospel of Thomas
 Hugh Ross (Australian politician) (1846–1912), New South Wales Labor politician
 Hugh Ross (Northern Ireland politician) (born 1922), Northern Ireland Presbyterian minister and member of the Orange Order
 Hugh Ross (astrophysicist) (born 1945), astrophysicist and Christian apologist
 Hugh Ross (actor) (born 1945), Scottish actor
 Hugh Ross (bridge) (1937-2017), American contract bridge player
 Hugh Ross (editor), film and television editor and voice actor